André Hennebicq (16 February 1836–31 March 1904) was a Belgian painter, specialising in historical pictures and murals. He trained under Joseph Stallaert in Tournai, his native town, and Jan Frans Portaels in the Académie Royale des Beaux-Arts in Brussels. He won the Prix de Rome (Belgium) in 1865; the gold medal at Brussels in 1872 (for Travailleurs dans la campagne romaine) and at Paris in 1874 (for Messaline, insultée par le peuple).

Notes and references

Further reading
 Hennebicq, Leon, 1937: La vie d’André Hennebicq. Peintre. Brussel: Ferdinand Larcier
 Hermans, C., 1923: Annuaire de l’Académie Royale des Sciences, des Lettres et des Beaux-Arts de Belgique: Notice sur André Hennebicq 89, 101-114 online edition
 Masson, P., Van Grieken., J., & Vandekerckhove, V. 2004: In eer hersteld. De monumentale schilderijenreeks van André Hennebicq in het Leuvense stadhuis. Leuven: Stad Leuven

1836 births
1904 deaths
Artists from Tournai
Académie Royale des Beaux-Arts alumni